Celosia palmeri, commonly known as Palmer's cockscomb, is a species of flowering plant in the amaranth family, Amaranthaceae, that is native to the lower Rio Grande Valley of Texas in the United States as well as northeastern Mexico. The specific name honours British botanist Edward Palmer (1829–1911), who collected the type specimen in Monclova Municipality, Coahuila in 1880. Flowering takes place from summer to winter.

References

External links

palmeri
Plants described in 1883
Flora of Northeastern Mexico
Flora of San Luis Potosí
Flora of the Rio Grande valleys